The 2010 Birmingham City Council Election took place on 6 May 2010 to elect members of Birmingham City Council in the West Midlands, England. One third of the council was up for election, one seat in each of the city's 40 council wards, with the election taking place at the same time as the general election.

Campaign
Before the election the council was under no overall control with the composition of the council being Conservative 49, Labour 36, Liberal Democrat 32 and Respect 3. The Conservatives and Liberal Democrats ran the council in coalition, while Labour formed the main opposition. 40 seats were up for election with 16 Conservative, 15 Labour, 9 Liberal Democrat and 1 Respect seats being defended.

Election results

Ward results

References

External links
 List of Candidates by Ward

2010
2010 English local elections
May 2010 events in the United Kingdom
2010s in Birmingham, West Midlands